Charles Middleton may refer to:
 Charles Middleton, 2nd Earl of Middleton (1649/50–1719), Scottish and English politician
 Charles Middleton, 1st Baron Barham (1726–1813), British aristocrat, First Lord of the Admiralty
 Charles Middleton (actor) (1874–1949), known for his portrayal of Ming the Merciless
 Charles Middleton (cricketer) (1868–1938), English cricketer
 Charles G. Middleton (born 1953), chief of the Savannah Fire Department until 2018
 Charles R. Middleton (born 1944), president of Roosevelt University from 2002 to 2015
 Charlie Middleton (footballer) (1910–1984), English footballer